The 2006 Vuelta a Asturias was the 50th edition of the Vuelta a Asturias road cycling stage race, which was held from 16 June to 20 June 2006. The race started and finished in Oviedo. The race was won by Óscar Sevilla of the  team.

General classification

References

Vuelta Asturias
2006 in road cycling
2006 in Spanish sport